Now Is the Hour is the tenth studio album by American singer Jennifer Rush. It was first released by Ariola Records on March 5, 2010. Among the songwriters that contributed to the project were Swedish music producer Jörgen Elofsson, British singer Natasha Bedingfield, and American country songwriter Sharon Vaughn. Rush's first studio album since 1998, it peaked at number 21 on the German Albums Chart. The first single was the ballad "Before the Dawn."

Critical reception

AllMusic editor Jon O'Brien found that Now Is the Hour "retains the epic power balladry of her mid-'80s heyday while also pursuing a previously unexplored dance-pop direction similar to Cher's fifty-something disco diva re-invention a decade earlier [...] For an artist so synonymous with the impassioned big-voiced vocal ballad, it's a surprise that she comes unstuck when attempting to tread the path of her signature hit, "The Power of Love," as the likes of "Before the Dawn," "Windows," and "Still" may provide the chance to showcase her impressive and slightly operatic tones, but they are so utterly unmemorable that you wish she'd had the confidence to just stick with her newfound uptempo leanings instead. Now Is the Hour might not exactly be worth a 12-year wait, but take away the perfunctory torch songs and it is a respectable comeback that suggests her one-hit wonder status is a rather unjust state of affairs."

Track listing

Charts

References

External links

2010 albums
Jennifer Rush albums